Submersion may refer to:
Being or going underwater, as via submarine, underwater diving, or scuba diving
Submersion (coastal management), the sustainable cyclic portion of foreshore erosion
Submersion (mathematics)
Submersion (Stargate Atlantis), an episode of the television series Stargate Atlantis

See also
Submerge (disambiguation)
Submergence (disambiguation)
Immersion (disambiguation)